In mathematics, specifically in functional analysis, a Banach algebra, A,  is amenable if all bounded derivations from A into dual Banach A-bimodules are inner (that is of the form  for some  in the dual module).

An equivalent characterization is that A is amenable if and only if it has a virtual diagonal.

Examples
 If A is a group algebra  for some locally compact group G then A is amenable if and only if G is amenable.
 If A is a C*-algebra then A is amenable if and only if it is nuclear.
 If A is a uniform algebra on a compact Hausdorff space then A is amenable if and only if it is trivial (i.e. the algebra C(X) of all continuous complex functions on X).

References 

 F.F. Bonsall, J. Duncan, "Complete normed algebras", Springer-Verlag (1973).
 H.G. Dales, "Banach algebras and automatic continuity", Oxford University Press (2001).
 B.E. Johnson, "Cohomology in Banach algebras", Memoirs of the AMS 127 (1972).
 J.-P. Pier, "Amenable Banach algebras", Longman Scientific and Technical (1988).
 Volker Runde, "Amenable Banach Algebras. A Panorama", Springer Verlag (2020).

Banach algebras